Phymorhynchus hyfifluxi is a species of sea snail, a marine gastropod mollusk in the family Raphitomidae.

Description

Distribution
This marine species has been found on hydrothermal vents in the north Fiji Basin.

References

 Beck L.A. (1996) Systematic position and relationship of Phymorhynchus hyfifluxi n. sp., a further new turrid gastropod species associated with hydrothermal vent sites in the north Fiji Basin. Archiv für Molluskenkunde 126: 109–115.

External links
 

hyfifluxi
Gastropods described in 1996